The Gantrisch is a mountain in the north-western Bernese Alps, located between the Simmental and the Aar valley in the canton of Bern. The mountain lies near Gurnigel Pass, from where it is usually climbed. A trail leads to the summit.

See also 
 Nature parks in Switzerland

References

External links

Gantrisch on Hikr

Mountains of the Alps
Mountains of Switzerland
Mountains of the canton of Bern
Two-thousanders of Switzerland